Imjingang station is a railway station on the Gyeongui Line as well as the Gyeongui–Jungang Line.

Service history
Since its initial opening on September 30, 2001, the station was originally served by Tonggeun commuter trains that ran between Seoul and Dorasan. However, the Tonggeun services were later cut back to run between Munsan and Dorasan on July 1, 2009, before later being replaced entirely by the DMZ Train service, which was introduced on May 4, 2014.

Passengers on the DMZ Train who were travelling to Dorasan station were required to disembark at this station to present identification and documents before being allowed to continue their journeys, as Dorasan station is located within the Civilian Control Zone.

On October 2, 2019, the DMZ Train halted operations due to concerns about the spread of an outbreak of African swine fever in South Korea.; as such, the station effectively received no trains from that date until March 28, 2020, when the Gyeongui–Jungang Line was extended to the station and a new 3.7 km shuttle service between Munsan and this station began operations.

On December 11, 2021, another new 3.7 km shuttle service between Imjingang Station and Dorasan Station began operations. This service operates only once during weekends and public holidays. People who are travelling to Dorasan station are required to disembark at this station to present identification and documents before being allowed to continue their journeys, as Dorasan station is located within the Civilian Control Zone.

References

External links

 Station information from Korail

Seoul Metropolitan Subway stations
Railway stations in Gyeonggi Province
Railway stations opened in 2001
Paju